The World Scrabble Championship 2007 was held in the Taj President Hotel, Mumbai, India between 9 November and 12 November. The winner was Nigel Richards of New Zealand.

The tournament began with a 24-round Swiss tournament, whose top two players contested a best-of-five final.

Results
The preliminary stage involved 104 players, the largest number of players in WSC history, over 24 rounds, using the "Chew Pairing" system to select the draw for each round.

Nigel Richards beat Ganesh Asirvatham of Malaysia 3–0 in the final. This was the first time either of them had reached the final. Ganesh was the number 1 rated player in the world at the time, and Nigel the form player had always been knocking on the door in majors and was a multiple winner of the Brand's Crossword Game King's Cup including 2007.

Nigel won the first game 412–316. He bingoed VARSITy; Ganesh bingoed sERINGA. Nigel's opening play was GAVOT with the V on the centre star. During the game Ganesh missed the bingo OUTCRAWL.

Nigel won the second game 400–371. Ganesh took an early lead with AETHERS but had to exchange tiles twice, and although he caught up again with ANTIENTS and a late-game bingo DUPLiED, and Nigel only bingoed once with ODONAtE, Nigel won on the strength of the value he got out of the J, Q and X with JERBIL, QUOHOG and FAX.

Nigel wins the third game 499-470 and becomes New Zealand's first world champion. This game was a bingo-fest with Nigel's RECOPIES, EQuINIAS and OVERAPT to Ganesh's TRECKING, ADNATION, DIrTIEST and a triple-triple TAILLEUR.  However, once again, Nigel's luck with drawing the high scoring letters saw him have the edge in a fitting finale.

Complete results

FINALS:
Game 1: Nigel 412 – Ganesh 316
Game 2: Nigel 400 – Ganesh 371
Game 3: Nigel 499 – Ganesh 470

References

External links
Official site

2007
2007 in Indian sport
2000s in Mumbai